This is a list of Texas A&M–Kingsville Javelinas football players in the NFL Draft.hhh

Key

Selections

References

Texas AandM-Kingsville

Texas AandM-Kingsville Javelinas